Avantcore is a single by underground hip hop artist Busdriver from his album Fear of a Black Tangent. It was released on Mush Records in 2005. The title track "Avantcore" includes a sample of the song "Turtles Have Short Legs" by Can.

Track listing

 "Avantcore" - 2:26
 Produced by Paris Zax
 "Happiness('s Unit of Measurement)" - 4:40
 Produced by Thavius Beck
 "Unemployed Black Astronaut" – 4:02
 Produced by Paris Zax
 "Avantcore" – 2:35
 D-Styles remix
 "Happiness('s Unit of Measurement)" – 4:18
 Prefuse 73 remix 
 "Unemployed Black Astronaut" – 4:39
 Nobody remix

External links
 Discogs
 Mush Records

2005 singles
2005 songs